Tithe Commutation Act may refer to:
 Tithe Commutation Act 1836 applied in England and Wales
 Tithe Commutation Act 1838 applied in Ireland